Aryl hydrocarbon receptor nuclear translocator-like 2, also known as Mop9, Bmal2, Clif, or Arntl2, is a gene.

Arntl2 is a paralog to Arntl, which are both homologs of the Drosophila Cycle. Homologs were also isolated in fish, birds and mammals such as mice and humans. Based on phylogenetic analyses, it was proposed that Arntl2 arose from duplication of the Arntl gene early in the vertebrate lineage, followed by rapid divergence of the Arntl gene copy. The protein product of the gene interacts with both CLOCK and NPAS2 to bind to E-box sequences in regulated promoters and activate their transcription.  Although Arntl2 is not required for normal function of the mammalian circadian oscillator, it may play an important role in mediating the output of the circadian clock.  Perhaps because of this, there is relatively little published literature on the role of Arntl2 in regulation of physiology.

Arntl2 is a candidate gene for human type 1 diabetes.

In over expression studies, ARNTL2 protein forms a heterodimer with CLOCK to regulate E-box sequences in the Pai-1 promoter.  Recent work suggest that this interaction may be in concert with ARNTL/CLOCK heterodimeric complexes.

See also 
 Arntl (Bmal1)

References

External links 
 
 
 

Transcription factors
PAS-domain-containing proteins